The Beneteau Oceanis 35.1 is a French sailboat that was designed by Group Finot/Conq, with an interior by Nauta Design, as a cruiser and first built in 2017.

The Beneteau Oceanis 35.1 is a development of the Beneteau Oceanis 35.

Production
The design was built by Beneteau in France, starting in 2017, but by 2021 it was out of production.

Design

The Oceanis 35.1 is a recreational keelboat, built predominantly of fiberglass and available in daysailer or cruising configurations. It has a fractional sloop rig, a plumb stem, a plum transom with an optional fold down tailgate, dual internally mounted spade-type rudders controlled by a wheel and a shallow or deep draft fixed fin keel or a stub keel with a centerboard. In cruiser configuration it displaces  and carries  of ballast, with the deep draft keel.

The design has sleeping accommodation for four to six people, depending on the interior design. All arrangements have a double "V"-berth in the bow cabin, combined with either one or two double-berth cabins aft. The galley may be located on either the port or starboard side and is equipped with a two-burner stove and a sink. In all arrangements the head is located just forward of the companionway ladder on the starboard side.

Operational history
In a review Boat Test wrote that the "Beneteau Oceanis 35.1 offers two-cabin and three-cabin arrangements, and a new L-shaped galley that will make cooking easier and safer underway. Her large cockpit proves equally useful for daysailing, cruising, club racing, or entertaining on the hook. An optional fold-out transom makes for easy boarding from the dock, a convenient step into a dinghy for a night ashore, or an ideal snorkeling platform. Twin rudders and wheels are handy in a boat that carries her wide beam well aft."

See also
List of sailing boat types

References

External links

Keelboats
Dinghies
2010s sailboat type designs
Sailing yachts
Sailboat types built in France
Sailboat type designs by Groupe Finot
Beneteau